Seminal Live is a 1989 album by English rock band The Fall, recorded partly in the studio and partly at live performances in 1988. The album was the last to be released by the group through Beggars Banquet Records, and as such is often seen as a "contractual obligation" album. It was also the last Fall album to feature Brix Smith, former wife of the lead singer Mark E. Smith, until her return for 1995's Cerebral Caustic.

The studio recordings on Seminal Live were all new songs and make up the first five tracks of the album—side one on the original vinyl release. The live recordings on side two, meanwhile, are all versions of previously-released tracks.

In a 2006 interview with The Pseud Mag fanzine, keyboardist Marcia Schofield called Seminal Live "the worst piece of shit I have ever worked on [...] Talk about exhausted and out of ideas. It was one of those-we've just come off tour and have to make a record so what shit covers can we bung on it?-album".

Reception
Critical response to the album was somewhat mixed. Andrew Collins, writing in the NME, suggests: "Seminal Live is worse than an intellectual letdown, it's a tease". The songs themselves also provoked a variety of responses from journalists. Jason Pettigrew of the Alternative Press writes: "For pure weirdness value, look no further than "Mollusc in Tyrol", a musique concrete rave-up on top of a Neubauten "Yu-Gung" rhythm track that's been buried alive". A reviewer for the Record Mirror, by contrast, says: "'Mollusc In Tyrol' is a totally unbearable drone which should never have found its way from the vaults". Jim Sullivan, for The Boston Globe, also singled out "Mollusc in Tyrol" as a "monotonous irritant", but stated that if the album "doesn't rank with the overall best of the Fall, it is a holding pattern that should neatly please and agitate".

Track listing

Vinyl version

 a home recording of Mark E. Smith singing over "Donkeys Bearing Cups" from Craig Leon's 1981 Nommos album

 All additional tracks are further live recordings
 Tracks 8–10, 12 and 14 recorded at the Arena, Vienna in Austria on 16 April 1988.
 Tracks 6, 7, and 11 recorded at an unknown venue, possibly in Manchester, in 1988. Track 13 recorded at Manchester G-Mex in 1988; Bill Grundy introduced the band onstage and his intro was used on the album.

Personnel
The Fall
 Mark E. Smith – vocals, violin on "Elf Prefix"
 Brix Smith – guitar and backing vocals on "Dead Beat Descendent", "Squid Law" and live tracks only
 Craig Scanlon – guitar, backing vocals
 Steve Hanley – bass guitar, banjo on "Pinball Machine"
 Simon Wolstencroft – drums
 Marcia Schofield – keyboards, backing vocals
with:
 Bill Grundy – voice on "Introduction" (uncredited)
Technical
 Shan Hira – production (all studio tracks; "Frenz")
 Mark E. Smith – production (all studio tracks; all live tracks, except "Kurious Oranj" and "Frenz")
 Ian Broudie – production ("Kurious Oranj")
 Dian Barton – engineering and live mixing (except "Kurious Oranj" and "Frenz")
 S.P. – cover art

References

External links
 Lyrics
 [ Review of "Seminal Live"] by Ted Mills, of Allmusic

The Fall (band) albums
Beggars Banquet Records live albums
The Fall (band) live albums
1989 live albums
1989 albums
Molluscs in popular culture